Mockerkin is a settlement in the English county of Cumbria. Historically part of Cumberland, it is situated just outside the Lake District National Park.

The name probably derives from the hill-top of a man called Corcán.

Governance
Mockerkin is within the Copeland UK Parliamentary constituency and the North West England European Parliamentary constituency. Trudy Harrison is the Member of parliament.

For the European Parliament residents in Mockerkin voted to elect MEP's for the North West England constituency.

For Local Government purposes it is in the Crummock + Derwent Valley Ward of Allerdale Borough Council  and the Bothel and Wharrels Division of Cumbria County Council.

The village also has its own Parish Council; Loweswater Parish Council, which is part of The Melbreak Communities (comprising the four parishes of Blindbothel, Buttermere, Lorton and Loweswater).

References

External links
 Cumbria County History Trust: Loweswater (nb: provisional research only – see Talk page)

Villages in Cumbria
Loweswater (village)